Coosa Valley Academy is a private, co-educational PK-12 school in Shelby County, Alabama, near Harpersville. 
Coosa Valley Academy is located in Harpersville, AL. 

Over 95% of students who graduate Coosa Valley enroll in a four-year college.

History

Accreditation 
Coosa Valley Academy is accredited by AISA and SACS.

Demographics 
The majority of the student body is white. The student body also includes Native American, Asian/Pacific Islander, Hispanic, and African Americans.

Recognition and Awards

Most Educated Faculty 
Coosa Valley Academy is rated in the top 20% of private schools in Alabama for schools with the most educated faculty. Over 75% of the faculty have a master's degree or higher, compared to an average of 50% for Alabama Private schools. Coosa Valley ranks 15th in the state.

Blue Ribbon School 
Coosa Valley Academy has been recognized as a Blue Ribbon School since 2007 (https://www.privateschoolreview.com/alabama/blue-ribbon-private-schools and http://aisaonline.org/academics/blue-ribbon-schools, retrieve 6/8/2019).

Attorney General's Safe School Initiative 
Attorney General Steve Marshall presented Coosa Valley Academy with their third consecutive Safe School Initiative award on April 18, 2018. The school was one of ten schools in the state to be recognized in 2018. Attorney General Marshall shared the following:In these times, we are all intensely aware of the serious responsibility our schools carry for the safe keeping of our children. Recent events have been heartbreaking reminders that we must remain vigilant and committed to provide the best protections possible in Alabama's schools. Each day that parents leave their children at school, they are entrusting what they hold most precious into the care of schoolteachers, principals, school resource officers, and other staff. With these awards, we honor those who have achieved particularly high standards and set examples that others may follow. In making this decision, judges noted many things that distinguished Coosa Valley Academy: the school's emergency "Go Bags", a large number of security camera's, and excellent communication with law enforcement and parents about how to get information if an emergency arises.

See also

References

Private high schools in Alabama
Education in Shelby County, Alabama
Segregation academies in Alabama
Private middle schools in Alabama
Private elementary schools in Alabama
Educational institutions established in 1970